Tischeria gaunacella is a species of lyonetiid moth in the family Tischeriidae.

References

Further reading

 

Tischeriidae
Articles created by Qbugbot
Moths described in 1843